Willi Bartholomae (born 31 January 1885, date of death unknown)  was a German rower who competed for the German Empire in the 1912 Summer Olympics. The German team won the bronze medal in the eight.

1912 German Men's eights rowing team
Otto Liebing
Max Bröske
Fritz Bartholomae
Willi Bartholomae
Werner Dehn
Rudolf Reichelt
Hans Matthiae
Kurt Runge
Max Vetter

References

External links
profile

1885 births
Year of death missing
Rowers at the 1912 Summer Olympics
Olympic rowers of Germany
Olympic bronze medalists for Germany
Olympic medalists in rowing
German male rowers
Medalists at the 1912 Summer Olympics